The Shoepac River is a  channel connecting Shoepac Lake and South Manistique Lake on the Upper Peninsula of Michigan in the United States. It is part of the Manistique River watershed, flowing to Lake Michigan.

See also
List of rivers of Michigan

References

Michigan  Streamflow Data from the USGS

Rivers of Michigan
Tributaries of Lake Michigan